The Abbot of Sweetheart (later Commendator of Sweetheart; also Abbot of New Abbey) was the head of the Cistercian monastic community of Sweetheart Abbey, in the ancient province of Galloway in the present area of  Dumfries and Galloway, founded by monks from Dundrennan Abbey with the patronage of Derbhfhorghaill inghean Ailein (a.k.a. "Dervorguilla Balliol"), Lady of Galloway, about 1275. The following are a list of abbots and commendators. 


List of abbots
 Henry, S.O.Cist., 1273 - 1280
 John, S.O.Cist., 1280 x 1290 - 1296
 Thomas, S.O.Cist., 1356 - 1404
 John, S.O.Cist., c.1409
 William Greenlaw, S.O.Cist., 1448 -1463
 Alexander Tyningham, S.O.Cist., 1486
 James Ruche, S.O.Cist., 1486
 Robert Greenlaw, S.O.Cist., 1515
 Herbert Browne, S.O.Cist., 1523 - 1530
 Richard Brown, S.O.Cist., 1530-1532
 Robert Arnot, S.O.Cist., 1532
 Herbert, S.O.Cist., 1538
 John Brown, S.O.Cist., 1538 - 1565
 Gilbert Broun, S.O.Cist., 1565 - 1612

List of abbot-commendators
 Gilbert Brown, 1565
 William Leslie, 1586
 Robert Maxwell, x 1612
 Robert Spottiswood, 1612 -1624

References

Bibliography
 Cowan, Ian B. & Easson, David E., Medieval Religious Houses: Scotland With an Appendix on the Houses in the Isle of Man, Second Edition, (London, 1976), pp. 208–10
 Watt, D.E.R. & Shead, N.F. (eds.), The Heads of Religious Houses in Scotland from the 12th to the 16th Centuries, The Scottish Records Society, New Series, Volume 24, (Edinburgh, 2001), p. 78

See also
 Sweetheart Abbey

Cistercian abbots by monastery
Scottish abbots
Lists of abbots